Rockcreek is a census-designated place in Washington County, Oregon, United States, north of U.S. Route 26. It is named for the Rock Creek neighborhood in the area. As of the 2010 census, the CDP population was 9,316.

Geography
The community is bordered on the south and west by Hillsboro, with Cornelius Pass Road dividing the two on the west and the Sunset Highway as the dividing line on the south.

Government
An unincorporated community, Rockcreek does not have a municipal government. Government services are provided by a variety of regional districts. The area lies within both the Hillsboro School District and the Beaverton School District. Fire protection is provided by Tualatin Valley Fire & Rescue, Hillsboro Fire & Rescue, and Washington County Fire District 2. Law enforcement comes from the Washington County Sheriff. Rockcreek is within the Portland metropolitan area's regional government, Metro, while parks are provided by the Tualatin Hills Park & Recreation District.

Demographics

As of the census of 2010, there were 9,316 people, 3,674 households, and 2,584 families residing in the CDP. The population density was 4,689.8 people per square mile (1,806.4/km2). There were 3,609 housing units at an average density of 1,799.8 per square mile (693.3/km2). The racial makeup of the CDP was 72.7% European American, 1.4% African American, 0.3% Native American, 19.1% Asian American, 0.2% Pacific Islander, 2.10% from other races, and 4.10% from two or more races. Hispanic or Latino of any race were 5.8% of the population.

There were 3,501 households, out of which 39.6% had children under the age of 18 living with them, 62.3% were married couples living together, 7.8% had a female householder with no husband present, and 26.9% were non-families. 20.3% of all households were made up of individuals, and 3.4% had someone living alone who was 65 years of age or older. The average household size was 2.69 and the average family size was 3.15.

In the CDP, the population was spread out, with 28.6% under the age of 18, 7.5% from 18 to 24, 31.5% from 25 to 44, 25.6% from 45 to 64, and 6.7% who were 65 years of age or older. The median age was 35 years. For every 100 females, there were 102.5 males. For every 100 females age 18 and over, there were 100.9 males.

The median income for a household in the CDP was $63,958, and the median income for a family was $71,377. Males had a median income of $51,257 versus $34,591 for females. The per capita income for the CDP was $30,102. About 4.2% of families and 6.5% of the population were below the poverty line, including 9.3% of those under age 18 and 2.0% of those age 65 or over.

References

Census-designated places in Oregon
Portland metropolitan area
Unincorporated communities in Washington County, Oregon
Census-designated places in Washington County, Oregon
Unincorporated communities in Oregon